George Slade Butler (1821–1882) was an English lawyer and antiquary.

Life
Butler was the son of Richard Weeden Butler, a surgeon in practice at Rye, Sussex, by his third wife, Rhoda Jane, only daughter of Daniel Slade, of London and Rye. Born at Rye on 4 March 1821, he was educated at a private school at Brighton. He was admitted a solicitor in Hilary term, 1843. He was in business in Rye, where he held the town-clerkship and the registrarship of the county court.

He was elected a Fellow of the Society of Antiquaries in March 1862, and died in Rye on 11 April 1882.

Works
Butler's Topographica Sussexiana originally appeared in the Collections of the Sussex Archaeological Society, and was later reprinted in one volume; it is a bibliography listing of the publications relating to the county of Sussex. He also contributed papers on the antiquities of Rye to the same journal.

References

Attribution

1821 births
1882 deaths
English antiquarians
19th-century antiquarians
Fellows of the Society of Antiquaries of London
19th-century English lawyers